Jacopo Bertucci (active first half 16th century) was an Italian painter of the Renaissance period. He is also known as Jacopone da Faenza. He was born in Faenza, and worked under Raphael in Rome. One of his pupils was Taddeo Zuccari. He was  active c. 1530 and painted in the manner of Raphael. He painted for the church of San Vitale at Ravenna. He died at the age of 20.

Corrado Ricci calls him Giacomo Bartuzzi (circa 1501–1579), while others use the surname Bertuzzi.

References

 A. Bliznukov, Precisazioni per Jacopo Bertucci, in “Proporzioni”, N.S., nn. 2/3, 2001–2002(2003), pp. 123–138.

External links

Census of Ferrarese Paintings and Drawings .

People from Faenza
16th-century Italian painters
Italian male painters
Italian Renaissance painters
1579 deaths
1500s births